Delamotte may refer to:

 Champagne Delamotte, a small producer of champagne
 Philip Henry Delamotte (1821–1889), British photographer and illustrator
 William Alfred Delamotte (1775–1863), British painter and engraver